Ayia Marina Kelokedharon is a village located in the Paphos District of Cyprus, east of Paphos near the town of Kelokedhara.

External links
Official municipality website

References

Communities in Paphos District